Podlesny is a rural locality (a settlement) in Uglyanskoye Rural Settlement, Verkhnekhavsky District, Voronezh Oblast, Russia. The population was 2,460 as of 2010. There are 30 streets.

Geography 
Podlesny is located 39 km west of Verkhnyaya Khava (the district's administrative centre) by road. Nikonovo is the nearest rural locality.

References 

Rural localities in Verkhnekhavsky District